Kamennochernovsky is a rural locality (a khutor) in Loboykovskoye Rural Settlement, Danilovsky District, Volgograd Oblast, Russia. The population was 128 as of 2010. There are 2 streets.

Geography 
Kamennochernovsky is located in steppe, on the left bank of the Chyornaya River, 23 km northeast of Danilovka (the district's administrative centre) by road. Loboykovo is the nearest rural locality.

References 

Rural localities in Danilovsky District, Volgograd Oblast